Ebonyi State is a state in the South-East geopolitical zone of Nigeria, bordered to the north and northeast by Benue State, Enugu State to the west, Cross River State to the east and southeast, and Abia State to the southwest. Named for the Abonyi (Aboine) River—a large part of which is in the state's south—Ebonyi State was formed from parts of Abia and Enugu state in 1996 and has its capital as Abakaliki.

One of the smallest states of Nigeria, Ebonyi is the 33rd largest in area and 29th most populous with an estimated population of nearly 2.9 million as of 2016. Geographically, the state is divided between the Cross–Niger transition forests in the far south and the drier Guinean forest–savanna mosaic in the rest of the state. The other important geographical features are the Cross River and its tributary, the River Aloma, which flow along Ebonyi's southeastern and eastern borders, respectively; while fellow Cross River tributaries, the Abonyi (Aboine), Asu, and Eze Aku rivers run through the state's interior.

After independence in 1960, the area of now-Ebonyi was a part of the post-independence Eastern Region until 1967 when the region was split and the area became part of the East Central State. Less than two months afterwards, the former Eastern Region attempted to secede in the three-year long Nigerian Civil War with Ebonyi as a part of the secessionist state of Biafra. At the war's end and the reunification of Nigeria, the East Central State was reformed until 1976 when the state's north became Anambra State and the south became Imo State. Fifteen years afterwards, Anambra and Imo states were divided with their eastern parts becoming Enugu State and Abia State, respectively. It was not until 1996, when Enugu State's east and Abia's northeast were split off and joined to form Ebonyi State.

Economically, Ebonyi State is based around agriculture, mainly of yams, rice, oil palm, and cassava crops. A key minor industry is mining due to lead, zinc, and limestone deposits around Abakaliki, and locally hand-made baskets of various sizes at Ntezi. Ebonyi has the joint-twentieth highest Human Development Index in the country and numerous institutions of tertiary education.

Geography 
It was one of the six states created in 1996 by the then federal military government of General Sani Abacha.  The State of Ebonyi was created from parts of both Enugu State and Abia State, which were the Abakaliki division from Enugu State and the Afikpo division from Abia State respectively. It has three senatorial zones, the Abakaliki division make up Ebonyi North and Ebonyi Central senatorial zones, while the Afikpo, Ohaozara, Onicha and Ivo division make up the Ebonyi South senatorial zone. Ebonyi has thirteen local government areas as well as local development centres created by the state government.  It is home to six prominent higher institutions of learning: Ebonyi State University, Abakaliki (EBSU); Alex Ekwueme Federal University Ndufu Alike Ikwo; Akanu Ibiam Federal Polytechnic, Unwana;  Federal College of Agriculture, Ishiagu; Federal College of Education (Technical), Isu; Ebonyi State College of Education Ikwo (EBSCOEI); College of Health Sciences, Ezzamgbo and Ebonyi State College of Health and Midwifery (EBSCONMU), Uburu. In 2021, three other Universities were introduced by Governor David Umahi, Aeronautical Engineering and that of Technology in Ezza and Izzi Local Government Areas (LGA), and King David University of Medical Science, Uburu, Ohaozara LGA, Ebonyi State.

Climate 
Ebonyi State has a humid tropical climate, with one rainy season and one dry season lasting for 8 and 4 months, respectively. The temperature typically ranges from 20 to 38 degrees Celsius during the dry season and from 16 to 28 degrees Celsius during the rainy season. Harmattan winds are common between December and January. The average annual temperature is 28 degrees Celsius, and the average annual humidity is 50-60%. The region receives an average annual precipitation of 2500mm.

Demographics
There are several Igbo dialects  spoken in Ebonyi State which includes Edda, Ehugbo (Afikpo), Izzi-Ezza-Mgbo-Ikwo dialect cluster, Oshiri, Unwara, Akpoha, Okposi, Onicha; and a mixed Igbo and Korring dialects spoken in Amuda-Okpolo, Ntezi-Okpoto and Effium, which is also familiar with Kukele in Cross River, and Utonkon in Benue States respectively.

Politics 
The State government is led by a democratically elected governor who works closely with members of the state's house of assembly. The Capital city of the state is Abakaliki.

Electoral system 
The electoral  system of each state is selected using a modified two-round system. To be elected in the first round, a candidate must receive the plurality of the vote and over 25% of the vote in at least two -third of the State local government Areas. If no candidate passes threshold, a second round will be held between the top candidate and the next candidate to have received a plurality of votes in the highest number of local government Areas.

Administration
In 1999, Dr. Sam Ominyi Egwu was elected as the first governor of the state under the People's Democratic Party (PDP). He was succeeded by Martin Elechi who was elected in 2007 and successfully ran for re-election in 2011, under the same PDP. Gov Martin Elechi was succeeded by the current Governor, Dave Umahi, who was elected in the March 2015 election and re-elected in March 2019 for a second term in office.

Natural resources
Ebonyi is primarily an agricultural region. It is a leading producer of rice, yam, potatoes, maize, beans, and cassava, and have a notable basket market in Nigeria. Rice is predominantly cultivated in Ikwo, yams in Izzi, with other regions in the state such as Amasiri, Edda and Ezillo making notable contributions, Effium and Ezzamgo taking the top spots in cassava production, and basket production in Ntezi. Ebonyi has several solid mineral resources, including lead, crude oil, and natural gas, but few large-scale commercial mining mines. The state government has, however, given some incentives to investors in the agro-allied sector to encourage production but capacity remains largely under utilized. Ebonyi is called "the salt of the nation" for its huge salt deposit at the Okposi and Uburu Salt Lakes. There are also some tourist locations within the state prominent ones include Abakaliki Green Lake, Uburu Salt Lake, Unwana and Ikwo Beaches.

Local government areas 

Ebonyi State consists of thirteen (13) Local Government Areas. They are:

 Abakaliki
 Afikpo North
 Afikpo South (Edda)
 Ebonyi
 Ezza North
 Ezza South
 Ikwo
 Ishielu
 Ivo
 Izzi
 Ohaozara
 Ohaukwu
 Onicha

Languages
Igbo language is the primary language and there is Korring language spoken by the Orring people of Ebonyi state who are also found in their numbers in northern Cross River state who are known as Ukelle people, and the Ufia and the Ogballa people found in Ado and Oju LGAs of Benue state. There are primarily ten Igbo dialects spoken in Ebonyi states.They are:Afikpo, Mgbo, Izzi, Ezaa, Edda, Ikwo, Kukele, Legbo, Mbembe,Okposi,Uburu.
Languages of Ebonyi State listed by LGA:

Education 

A list of tertiary institutions in Ebonyi state includes:

 Akanu Ibiam Federal Polytechnic
 Federal College of Agriculture, Ishiagu
 Ebonyi state University
 Federal University Ndufu Alike Ikwo
Ebonyi State College of Health and Midwifery, Uburu
 Federal College of Education (Technical), Isu
 King David College of Medicine, Uburu, Ebonyi State

Notable people

 
 
 Anyim Pius Anyim
 Uche Azikiwe
 Andy Chukwu
 Onyebuchi Chukwu
 Martin Elechi
 Akanu Ibiam
 Chigozie Ogbu
 Frank Ogbuewu
 Ogbonnaya Onu
 Emmanuel Onwe
 Nnenna Oti
 Patoranking
 Sinach
 Tekno
 Dave Umahi

See also
List of people from Ebonyi State
2011 clashes in Ebonyi State

Ebonyi State Executive Council

References

External links
 For All Things Ebonyi State

 
States of Nigeria
States and territories established in 1996